Middle East Studies Association (often referred to as MESA) is a learned society, and according to its website, "a non-profit association that fosters the study of the Middle East, promotes high standards of scholarship and teaching, and encourages public understanding of the region and its peoples through programs, publications and services that enhance education, further intellectual exchange, recognize professional distinction, and defend academic freedom.".

History
MESA was founded in 1966 with 51 original members. Its current membership exceeds 2,700 and it "serves as an umbrella organization for more than fifty institutional members and thirty-six affiliated organizations".  It is a constituent society of the American Council of Learned Societies and the National Council of Area Studies Associations, and a member of the National Humanities Alliance.

Regions of interest to MESA members include Iran, Turkey, Afghanistan, Israel, Pakistan, and the countries of the Arab world from the seventh century to modern times. Spain, Southeastern Europe, the Soviet Union and other regions also are included for the periods in which their territories were part of the Middle Eastern empires or were under the influence of Middle Eastern civilization. Historians comprise the largest group of disciplinary specialists in MESA followed by political science/international relations, anthropology, and language and literature.

Activities
The current president is Eve Troutt Powell, University of Pennsylvania.

Publications
The International Journal of Middle East Studies (IJMES) is a quarterly journal published by Cambridge University Press under the auspices of MESA. The editor is Joel Gordon of University of Arkansas.

The Review of Middle East Studies (RoMES) is MESA’s journal of review. MESA policy has established the focus of RoMES as the state of the craft in all fields of Middle East studies. The Editor is Heather Ferguson and the journal is based at Claremont McKenna College.

MESA has a very active Committee on Academic Freedom (CAF) that has two wings: CAFMENA (Middle East and North Africa, established in 1990) and CAFNA (North America, established in 2005). Through CAF, MESA monitors infringements on academic freedom on the Middle East and North Africa worldwide.

Each year CAF nominates candidates for MESA’s Academic Freedom Award. The winners are confirmed by the Board of Directors.

Controversies
In 2007, Bernard Lewis  and Fouad Ajami started  Association for the Study of the Middle East and Africa (ASMEA) as a rival to MESA, as they saw MESA as "dominated by academics who have been critical of Israel and of America's role in the Middle East."

In mid-March 2022, MESA voted by a margin of 787 to 167 to join the Boycott, Divestment and Sanctions (BDS) movement to hold Israel to account for alleged human rights abuses against the Palestinians. MESA's decision was criticised by the Academic Engagement Network, the AMCHA Initiative,  and ASMEA.

Awards 
Albert Hourani Book Award

Since 1991 MESA has awarded the Albert Hourani Book Award to recognize "the very best in Middle East studies scholarship". The prize is named after Albert Hourani, "to recognize his long and distinguished career as teacher and mentor".

Malcolm Kerr Award

The MESA Dissertation Awards were established in 1982 to recognize exceptional achievement in research and writing for/of dissertations in Middle East studies. In 1984 the award was named for Malcolm H. Kerr to honor his significant contributions to Middle East studies. Awards are given in two categories: Social Sciences and Humanities.

MESA Mentoring Award

Since 1996 the MESA Mentoring Award has recognized exceptional contributions retired faculty have made to the education and training of others.

Jere L. Bacharach Service Award

Since 1997 Jere L. Bacharach Service Award has recognized the contributions of individuals through their outstanding service to MESA or the profession. Service is defined broadly to include work in diverse areas, including but not limited to outreach, librarianship, and film.

Former presidents 
The following persons have been presidents of the association:

 2020-21 Dina Rizk Khoury
 2018-19 Judith E. Tucker
 2016–17 Beth Baron
 2014–15 Nathan Brown
 2013 Peter Sluglett
 2012 Fred Donner
 2011 Suad Joseph
 2010 Roger M.A. Allen
 2009 Virginia Aksan
 2008 Mervat Hatem
 2007 Zachary Lockman
 2006 Juan Cole
 2005 Ali Banuazizi
 2004 Laurie Brand
 2003 Lisa Anderson
 2002 Joel Beinin
 2001 R. Stephen Humphreys
 2000 Jere L. Bacharach
 1999 Barbara Stowasser
 1998 Philip S. Khoury
 1997 Leila Fawaz
 1996 Farhad Kazemi
 1995 Ann M. Lesch
 1994 Rashid I. Khalidi
 1993 John O. Voll
 1992 Barbara Aswad
 1991 Dale F. Eickelman
 1990 Yvonne Y. Haddad
 1989 John L. Esposito
 1988 William B. Quandt
 1987 Michael C. Hudson
 1986 Elizabeth W. Fernea
 1985 Kemal Karpat
 1984 Ira M. Lapidus
 1983 Richard T. Antoun
 1982 I. William Zartman
 1981 Nikki R. Keddie
 1980 Farhat Ziadeh
 1979 Afaf Lutfi al‐Sayyid Marsot
 1978 Wilfred Cantwell Smith
 1977 George Makdisi
 1976 L. Carl Brown
 1975 Roderic H. Davison
 1974 Leonard Binder
 1973 Charles Issawi
 1972 Malcolm H. Kerr
 1971 John S. Badeau
 1970 William M. Brinner
 1969 R. Bayly Winder
 1968 George Hourani
 1967 Morroe Berger
 1966 G.E. von Grunebaum (Honorary)

References

External links
 
 The MESA Debate: The Scholars, the Media, and the Middle East, video from the debate 22 November 1986, Boston MA. Participants: Bernard Lewis, Edward Said, Leon Wieseltier and Christopher Hitchens. The chairman: William H. McNeill

Middle East
Learned societies of the United States
Middle Eastern studies in the United States
Member organizations of the American Council of Learned Societies
Organizations established in 1966
1966 establishments in the United States